Wormhole Physics may refer to:

Wormhole, the scientific study of wormholes
Wormhole physics (Stargate), the fictional laws that govern wormhole travel in Stargate